Smooth is a bimonthly magazine, published by Sandra Vasceannie geared toward young urban men that includes a mix of news, entertainment, urban fashion, music, movies, books, sports reporting, as well as feature articles on the hottest stars in black entertainment.

History and profile
Smooth was established by Sandra Vasceannie in 2002.
The magazine covers feature photos of women from around the world. Smooth also provides readers with coverage of new gadgets, cars, video games, politics, technology and sex.

Vasceannie also publishes a spin-off magazine: Smooth Girl, which is a showcase for the kind of pin-up models featured in Smooth.

References

Further reading

External links 
Smooth's official site

African-American magazines
Bimonthly magazines published in the United States
Men's magazines published in the United States
Magazines established in 2002